This is a list of notable alumni and faculty of  Queens College, City University of New York.

Business
Leslie Abramson - Attorney, defended Lyle and Erik Menendez
Russell Artzt - Co founder Computer Associates
Gary Barnett (real estate developer) - Founder of Extell Development Company
Jill E. Barad - Former chief executive officer of Mattel
David Cancel - Serial Technology Entrepreneur and Entrepreneur in Residence at Harvard Business School
Jerry Colonna - Well-known venture capitalist and entrepreneur coach
Eugene R. Fidell - Attorney, Guantanamo Bay detention camp critic
Mark M. Ford - Entrepreneur
Lee Garfinkel - Former cihef executive officer of the New York office of Foote, Cone & Belding
Leonard Grunstein - Finance executive
Dan Hackman - Finance executive
Charlie Harary - Investor and motivational speaker
Patricia Hynes - Former president of the New York City Bar Association
Frederick S. Jaffe - Former vice president of Planned Parenthood Federation of America
Alan Lazar - Partner of southern California Law Firm
Stewart Liff - Management consultant and author
Ruth Madoff - Wife of Bernard L. Madoff
Diane Mitnik - Vice President and Assistant General Counsel, Boyd Gaming Corporation
Donna Orender - WNBA president
Cindy Rakowitz - Division President for Playboy Enterprises (1986-2001)
Jeffrey Steinberger - Trial attorney, TV commentator & analyst
Charles Wang - founder of Computer Associates, owner of the New York Islanders

Education
Stevanne Auerbach - Psychologist, "Dr. Toy"
Werner Baer - Jorge Lemann Professor of Economics at University of Illinois Urbana-Champaign
Elaine Barkin - Music theorist educator
 Warren Bebbington - retired Vice-Chancellor, University of Adelaide
Jean-Claude Brizard - CEO of Chicago Public Schools
Vévé Amasasa Clark - Professor of African-American studies at the University of California, Berkeley
Ester Fuchs Professor of Public Affairs and Political Science, Columbia University
Cheryl Lehman - Accounting academic
Stephanie Pace Marshall - Founder of Illinois Math and Science Academy
Joseph S. Murphy (1933-1998) - President of Queens College, President of Bennington College, and Chancellor of the City University of New York
Edward John Ray - President of Oregon State University
Linda Siegel - cognitive psychologist, holder of the Dorothy C. Lam Chair in Special Education at the University of British Columbia 1996–2015
Dorothea Braginsky 1939- Psychologist, Fairfield University
Arthur M. Langer - Professor of Professional Practice, Columbia University, Founder of Workforce Opportunity Services

Entertainment and media
Ted Alexandro - comedian
Martin Aronstein - theatrical lighting designer
Annet Artani - singer, songwriter, co-wrote "Everytime" with Britney Spears
Jay Bak - rapper and singer based in South Korea
Lidia Bastianich - celebrity chef and host of Lidia's Italy
Joy Behar - comedian and co-host of The View
Adrien Brody - actor, academy award winner, Attended as student in 1990
Glen Brunman - film and television soundtrack executive and producer
Danny Burstein - Broadway actor
Fran Capo - comedian
Lucille Carra - documentary film producer
Angelo Corrao - Italian American Film Editor
Jason Cuadrado - director and producer
Yanna Darili - model, Greek television personality
Peter Dizozza - composer
Fran Drescher - actress, producer The Nanny
Dennis Elsas - radio personality: WNEW–FM, WFUV–FM
Nargis Fakhri - model and Bollywood actress
Jon Favreau - actor and director, director of Iron Man and Iron Man 2
David Zelag Goodman - screenwriter, playwright
Marvin Hamlisch - Hollywood and Broadway composer
Neophytos Ioannou - AEA Actor, Singer, Voice Teacher & Audition Coach
Annette Insdorf - film historian and author
Alan Jacobson - thriller writer
Ron Jeremy - prolific pornographic film actor
Herb Kaplow - television news correspondent
Jason Katims - television writer and producer
Carole King - songwriter and recording artist
Richard Kline - "Larry Dallas" in Three's Company
Carol Leifer - Stand-up comedian, writer, actress and producer
Bob Linden - host and producer of Go Vegan Radio
Hal Linden - actor, producer, and musician
Clair Marlo - composer, singer, record producer, songwriter - went from 1976 to 1977 and then went to Berklee College of Music
Perri Pierre - actor and film producer
DJ Rekha Malhotra - DJ, producer, educator of South Asian music
Ray Romano - actor, comedian (attended 1975–1978 – dropped out after accumulating only 15 credits in three years but returned in later years during which he made Dean's list)
Howie Rose - sportscaster for the New York Mets and New York Islanders.
Neil Rosen - Emmy award-winning movie critic, NY1
Michael Savage (formerly known as Michael Weiner) – radio talk show personality and author
Nancy Savoca - screenwriter, film director and producer
Jerry Seinfeld - comedian
Perry Serpa - Singer/Songwriter/Pianist of The Sharp Things and rock music publicist.
Nestor Serrano - actor
Paul Simon - singer, songwriter, musician, and member of Simon and Garfunkel
Tommy Jose Stathes - animation researcher, restorer, archivist, and School of Visual Arts professor
Michael Stewart - playwright
Bobby Susser - songwriter, record producer, and performer
Lorenzo Thomas - poet
Martin Untrojb -WCBS 880 Producer and Voice Over Actor
Mal Waldron - jazz pianist
Dennis Wolfberg - comedian
Marv Wolfman - comic book and animation writer
Jay Wolpert - television producer, screenwriter
Ben Younger - screenwriter and director
Karen Yu (born 1992), professional wrestler, also known as "Karen Q" and "Wendy Choo".

Fictional characters
George Costanza - Fictional television character from Seinfeld
Carrie Heffernan - Took courses for law during season 3 of 'King of Queens
Eric Murphy - Fictional television character from Entourage. Attended for two years before dropping out to become the manager of Vincent Chase.
Jerry Seinfeld - Fictional television character from "Seinfeld"
Betty Suarez - Fictional television character from Ugly Betty. Graduated in 2005 with a BFA in Media

Government and politics
Gary Ackerman - United States Representative from New York (1983-2013)
Joel Benenson - Democratic pollster, chief political consultant for Hillary Clinton presidential campaign, 2016
Shifra Bronznick - Prominent Jewish Women's rights activist
Kema Chikwe - National Women Leader of the Nigerian political party PDP, former aviation minister
Anthony Como - former NYC Council Member
Costa Constantinides - nonprofit leader, former NYC Council Member, Queens College professor
Joseph Crowley - former United States Representative from New York's 7th congressional district (1999-2019), former Queens County Democratic Chairman
Mark Danish - former Florida House of Representatives
Adriano Espaillat - United States Representative from New York's 13th congressional district, former member of the New York State Senate and New York State Assembly
Rafael Espinal - Executive Director of  Freelancers Union former NYC Council Member
Arthur J. Finkelstein - GOP political consultant
Steven W. Fisher - former New York State Justice, attorney in Wendy's massacre
Marvin E. Frankel - litigator, judge, legal scholar, and human rights activist
Helen W. Gillmor - U.S. Federal Judge
Deborah J. Glick - NY State Assemblywoman
Mark M. Goldblatt - Political commentator
Andrew Goodman - civil rights worker, murdered in Mississippi at the age of 20 during Freedom Summer of 1964, while still a student
Dan Halloran - former NYC council member, Theodist
Julia Harrison - NYC Council Member
Alan Hevesi - former New York State Comptroller, former New York State Assemblyman, former Queens College professor
Andrew Hevesi - New York State Assembly
Dov Hikind - former New York State Assemblyman
Blaise Ingoglia - Florida state assembly
Dennis G. Jacobs - Chief Judge of the United States Court of Appeals for the Second Circuit
Jeffrey D. Klein - former New York State senator
Alan P. Krasnoff - former Chesapeake, Virginia Mayor
Rory I. Lancman - former NYC Council Member and former New York state Assemblyman
Nathan Leventhal - former NYC Deputy Mayor, former President, Lincoln Center
Joseph McGoldrick (1901–1978) - former NYC Comptroller and NY State Residential Rent Control Commissioner, lawyer, and professor at Queens College
Helen Marshall - former Queens Borough President
Nettie Mayersohn - former member of New York State Assembly
Hiram Monserrate - former New York State Senator
Diane Patrick (B.A. 1972) - labor lawyer and former First Lady of Massachusetts (2007–2015) 
Jose Peralta - Former New York State Assemblyman and New York State Senator
Sylvia Pressler - former Judge
Ronald Spadafora - former FDNY chief and supervisor of September 11 rescue and recovery efforts
Toby Ann Stavisky - New York state Senator
James Vacca - former NYC Council Member and Queens College professor
Jeffrey White - former North California District Judge

Humanities
Yitzchok Adlerstein - Rabbi, Writer
David A. Adler - Author
Mel Alexenberg - Science Artist and Art Educator
Amin Tarzi - Middle East Studies
Toni Cade Bambara - Author, activist
Nino Lo Bello - Journalist
Michael Berenbaum - Scholar, writer, Rabbi
Ann Birstein - Memoirist, Fulbright Scholar
Erika Bourguignon - Anthropologist
Robert Boyers - Literary essayist, cultural critic and memoirist.
Alex Caldiero - Poet, scholar of humanities
Vévé Amasasa Clark - Scholar of African American Studies
Marylyn Dintenfass - Painter
Alan Dugan - Poet
Yael Eckstein - Religious Activist
Marc Estrin - Political writer
Jeff Faux - Founder of Economic Policy Institute
Bella Feldman - Sculpting innovator
Marie Ferrarella - Romance writer
Juan Flores - Scholar of Latino Studies
Ellen G. Friedman - Author, Woman's studies
Robert Lawrence Friedman - Author, recipient of Hearst Scholar Award
Ruth Gay - Writer about Jewish Life
Jeff Gomez - Writer and transmedia producer
Martin Gottlieb - Editor at New York Times
Robert Hessen - Economist, historian
Cynthia Holz - Correspondent and Author
Johanna Hurwitz - Children's Author
Jane Irish - Ceramicist
Susan Isaacs - Author, essayist, screenwriter
Bernard Kalb - Journalist, media critic, author
Marvin Kalb - Journalist
Nasser Khalili - Scholar, philanthropist
Bernard Krisher - Journalist
Corky Lee - Journalistic Photographer
Judith Lorber - Sociologist
Felipe Luciano - Journalist
Irving Malin - Literary critic
 Liv Mammone - Poet
Nellie Y. McKay - scholar and co-editor of Norton Anthology of African-American Literature
Samuel Menashe - Poet, Biochemist, Veteran
Bruce Bueno de Mesquita - Political Scientist
Joan Nestle - Author
Richard Ofshe - Sociologist
Jim Osman - Sculptor
Claude V. Palisca - professor of music history
Herbert S Parmet - Distinguished historian and political author
Irene Peslikis - Feminist artist
Mark Podwal - Artist and physician
Shana Poplack - Linguistics
Lina Puerta - Artist
Dorothy Rabinowitz - awarded 2001 Pulitzer Prize for Commentary
Colleen Randall  – American abstract painter
Marcia Resnick - Photographer
Robert Rosenblum - Art historian, curator, writer
John Rowan - Vietnam Veteran
Arlene Rush – artist and sculptor
Lloyd Schwartz - Pulitzer Prize winner in Journalism
 Joel Shatzky (1943-2020) - writer and literary professor
Lowery Stokes Sims - Former curator at Museum of Arts and Design
Marilyn Singer - Children's author
Arnold Skemer - novelist and publisher
Elliot Sperling - Expert on Tibet
Linda Stein - Sculptor, feminist (interviewed in Borat)
Rosalyn Terborg-Penn - historian
Eric Wolf - anthropologist

Music
Edward W. Hardy - composer, violinist
Salman Ahmad - musician, Junoon
Sol Berkowitz - composer and music educator
Peter Calandra - pianist and composer
Noel DaCosta - jazz musician, composer
Tina Chancey - multi-instrumentalist
Gil Dor - Israeli guitar player
Leslie Dunner - composer and conductor
JoAnn Falletta - classical musician and orchestral conductor
John Feeley - classical guitarist
Ellie Greenwich - singer, songwriter and producer
Reri Grist - coloratura soprano
Herbert Grossman - conductor
Lisa Gutkin - Grammy winning violinist
Antonio Hart - jazz musician
Conrad Herwig - jazz trombonist
Douglas Knehans - composer
Leo Kraft - composer
Meyer Kupferman - composer and clarinetist
Paul Lansky – pioneer computer musician and composer at Princeton
Carolyn Leigh - lyricist, composer
Mimi Lerner - opera singer
Lewis Lockwood - musicologist
Frank Lopardo - American operatic tenor
John Mateer - Singer/songwriter & recording artist.
Marcus Miller - jazz composer
Tito Munoz - conductor
Arturo O'Farrill - jazz musician
Marco Oppedisano - guitarist and composer
Lou Pearlman - music producer
Luis Perdomo - pianist
Raoul Pleskow - composer
Nancy B. Reich - musicologist
James Nyoraku Schlefer - composer of Shakuhachi
Paul Simon - composer, singer, musician, and member of Simon and Garfunkel
Erika Sunnegårdh - operatic soprano
George Tsontakis - composer and conductor
William Westney - classical pianist
Davide Zannoni - classical music composer

Science and technology
Kenneth Appel - Mathematician proved four color theorem
Boris Aronov - Computer scientist (computational geometry)
Inge Auerbacher - Chemist, author, playwright, Holocaust survivor
Steven J. Burakoff - cancer specialist and the author of Therapeutic Immunology (2001) and Graft-Vs.-Host Disease: Immunology, Pathophysiology, and Treatment (1990)
Anne Carter - Technology economist
Arturo Casadevall - Molecular microbiologist
Marie Maynard Daly - Biochemist, first African American woman to earn a Phd in chemistry
Celso-Ramón García - Obstetrician and gynecologist
Edgar Gilbert - Coding Theorist
David Gries - Computer Scientist
Mohammad Salman Hamdani - Biochemist, cited in the Patriot Act for heroism on 9/11
Michael Hecht - Researcher
Richard Laub - Paleontologist
Ira B. Lamster - Periodontist and professor of health management
Jerry Lawson - Electronic engineer
Stanley Milgram - Psychologist
Bernard Salick - Entrepreneur, researcher, nephrologist
Robert Moog - inventor of the Moog synthesizer
Howard Moskowitz - market researcher and psychophysicist
Elizabeth F. Neufeld - Geneticist
Nicholas Rescher - Philosopher
Elissa Shevinsky - Entrepreneur, information security researcher, feminist
Russell Targ - Physicist
Alexander L. Wolf - Computer Scientist, president of Association for Computing Machinery
Aaron D. Wyner - information theorist noted for his contributions in coding theory
Bruce M. Zagelbaum - Physician and researcher in sports ophthalmology

Sports

 Marilyn Aschner (born 1948) - professional tennis player
Jane Bartkowicz - tennis player
Glenn Braica - Men's basketball coach
Charlie Hoefer - Basketball player
Gail Marquis - basketball player
 Tre McLean (born 1993) - basketball player in the Israeli Basketball Premier League
Donna Orender (née Geils; born 1957) - Women's Pro Basketball League All-Star & former WNBA president
Diana Redman (born 1984) - Israeli soccer player
Norm Roberts - Assistant men's basketball coach at Kansas

Notable faculty
Famous faculty at Queens College have included:
 Salman Ahmed, musician, band Junoon
 Benny Andrews, artist
 Paul Avrich, historian
 Ben-Zion Bokser, prominent Conservative Rabbi
 Donald Byrd, jazz musician
 Elliott Carter, composer
 Barry Commoner, biologist
 Costa Constantinides, political scientist and urban expert
 Luigi Dallapiccola, composer
 Bogdan Denitch, sociologist
 Joshua Freeman, historian
 Azriel Genack, physicist
 Susanna Grannis, outspoken academic on helping minority students and students with disabilities gain access to education
 Andrew Hacker, political scientist
 Michael Harrington, political philosopher
 Samuel Heilman, Sociologist
 Banesh Hoffmann, mathematician, worked with Albert Einstein
 Chin Kim, violinist
 John Frederick Lange, Jr., author
 Mieczysław Maneli, philosopher and diplomat
 Joseph McElroy, author
 Elliott Mendelson, mathematician
 Edwin E. Moise, mathematician
 Luc Montagnier, virologist, winner of the 2008 Nobel Prize in Physiology or Medicine for his discovery of the human immunodeficiency virus (HIV) (endowed professorship, 1997/8–2001)
 Thea Musgrave, composer
 Marco Oppedisano, composer
 Arbie Orenstein, American musicologist, author, and pianist
 George Perle, composer
 Koppel Pinson, historian
 Hortense Powdermaker, anthropologist
 Gregory Rabassa, literary translator
 Stefan Ralescu, mathematician
 Karol Rathaus, composer
 Charles Repole, actor, theater director
 Reynold Ruffins, Visual artist and professor emeritus
 Douglas Rushkoff, Media Expert and futurologist
 Roger Sanjek, anthropologist
 Arthur Sard, mathematician
 Bruce Saylor, composer
 Carl Schachter, musician
 Dennis Sullivan, mathematician
 David Syrett, naval historian
 Harold Syrett (1913-1984), President of Brooklyn College
 John Tytell, author
 James Vacca, urban expert
 Robert Ward, composer
 Yevgeny Yevtushenko, Russian poet
 Roby Young, Soccer

References

Queens College, City University of New York